Transducin (beta)-like 1X-linked, also known as TBL1X, is a protein which in humans is encoded by the TBL1X gene.

Function 

The protein encoded by this gene has sequence similarity with members of the WD40 repeat-containing protein family. The WD40 group is a large family of proteins, which appear to have a regulatory function. It is believed that the WD40 repeats mediate protein-protein interactions and members of the family are involved in signal transduction, RNA processing, gene regulation, vesicular trafficking, cytoskeletal assembly and may play a role in the control of cytotypic differentiation. This encoded protein is found as a subunit in corepressor SMRT (silencing mediator for retinoid and thyroid receptors) complex along with histone deacetylase 3 protein. This gene is located adjacent to the ocular albinism gene and it is thought to be involved in the pathogenesis of the ocular albinism with late-onset sensorineural deafness phenotype. This gene is highly similar to the Y chromosome TBL1Y gene.

Interactions 

TBL1X has been shown to interact with:
 GPS2, and 
 HDAC3,
 NCOA1,  and
 NCOA2.

References

Further reading